Muhammad Mohar Ali; 1929–2007) was a British Bangladeshi Islamic scholar, historian and barrister. He is the only Bengali to have received the King Faisal International Prize.

Academic career
Mohar Ali was born in 1929 in Khulna in Bengal. Studying at Dhaka University, he obtained a degree in history in 1952 and a master's degree in 1953. In 1963 he obtained a PhD from SOAS, University of London, and in 1964 studied bar-at-law at Lincoln's Inn, London.

Between 1954 and 1976 he worked as a university lecturer in Bengal, becoming a professor, and moved in 1976 to Saudi Arabia to teach Islamic history at Imam Muhammad ibn Saud Islamic University in Riyadh for 12 years, followed by 7 years of teaching at the Islamic University of Madinah. He worked then as a researcher at King Fahd Complex for the Printing of the Holy Qur'an in years 1415–16 AH. He also worked at Dhaka University in 1965–69, at the official Historical Document Centre in 1966–71, and the chief editor for the Historical Society magazine. His university teaching career lasted for more than 40 years.

Mohar Ali died in London on 11 April 2007.

Author
Ali was a specialist in Islamic history – in particular the history of Bengal. His book, History of the Muslims of Bengal, is considered an important reference in the history of the propagation of Islam in the region and its cultural and political effects. It also deals with the struggle of Bengali Muslims against the British colonial rule, and the Islamic influence on Bengali architecture and literature.

His other books deal with the Islamic rule in India in the 19th century, Islam and the Modern world, the history of the Indian subcontinent, the Bengali reaction to Christian missionaries, in addition to articles in specialist magazines and conference participation in Bangladesh, Pakistan, the UK and the US.

Ali won the King Faisal International Prize for Islamic Studies in 2000.

While most of his books and essays are in English, he has translated Jawhart al-Bukhari from Arabic into Bengali and published a word for word English translation of the Qur'an in addition to Arabic essays such as Orientalists' Claims concerning the Glorious Qur'an.

He has also written books in response to the Orientalists' approach to the biography of Muhammad and their theories about the Qur'an: Sirat Al-Nabi and the Orientalists (1997) and The Qur'an and the Orientalists (2004).

Main works

References
 The main reference used is an Arabic article

External links
 English biography
 Commemoration Meeting on the Life and work of Dr Mohar Ali

Arabic links
 Brief biography at Al-Madinah Research and Studies Center

1929 births
2007 deaths
People from Khulna
Bangladeshi Sunni Muslim scholars of Islam
Bengali writers
University of Dhaka alumni
Alumni of SOAS University of London
Historians of Islam
20th-century Bangladeshi historians
21st-century Bangladeshi historians